Syria (SYR) competed at the 2009 Mediterranean Games in Pescara, Italy. The nation had a total number of 30 participants (26 men and 4 women).

Medals

Gold
 Weightlifting
Men's 105 kg (Clean & Jerk): Ahed Joughili
Men's 105 kg (Snatch): Ahed Joughili

Silver
 Wrestling
Men's Freestyle 55 kg: Firas Al-Rifai
Men's Freestyle 66 kg: Mazen Qadmanie
Men's Freestyle 96 kg: Raja Al-Karrad

Bronze
 Wrestling
Men's Greco-Roman 66 kg: Moustafa Al-Nakdali
Men's Freestyle 60 kg: Ghazwan Al-Lazkani
 Weightlifting
Men's 56 kg (Clean & Jerk): Ramo Mustapha
 Karate
Men's under-67 kg: Karem Othman
 Boxing
Men's bantam 54 kg: Wessam Salamana
Men's heavyweight 91 kg: Mohammad Ghossoun
 Judo
Men's extra-light 60 kg: Fadi Darwish

See also
 Syria at the 2005 Mediterranean Games

References

Nations at the 2009 Mediterranean Games
2009
Mediterranean Games